Rhyparochrominae is a subfamily of dirt-colored seed bugs in the family Rhyparochromidae. There are more than 410 genera and 2,000 described species in Rhyparochrominae.

See also
 List of Rhyparochrominae genera

References

Further reading

External links

 

Rhyparochromidae